Thom Filicia  is an American interior designer, known for his role as an interior design expert on the American television program Queer Eye for the Straight Guy. He is also a co-author of a book based on the show.

Biography
Filicia graduated from Syracuse University's College of Visual and Performing Arts with a Bachelor of Fine Arts in interior design.

Filicia began his career at renowned design firms Parish-Hadley, Robert Metzger, and Bilhuber & Associates. He is the founder and chief creative officer of New York City-based design firm, Thom Filicia, Inc., founded in 1998. Filicia's design portfolio includes various projects such as the VIP Suite for the USA Pavilion at the World's Fair in Aichi, Japan, an eco-friendly apartment for Riverhouse, Manhattan's first premium (LEED certified) "green" luxury condominium tower, and designing the holiday decoration installation with American Christmas for the  Radio City Music Hall.

Filicia got cast as the interior design expert in the Emmy-Award-winning show Queer Eye for the Straight Guy. Filicia has also hosted several shows for the Style Network, including Dress My Nest and Tacky House.

He was a guest judge on HGTV's The White Room Challenge.

In 2022, he was a contestant on the second season of RuPaul’s Secret Celebrity Drag Race as Drag Queen "Jackie Would" and made it through 3 weeks before being eliminated in a lip sync to Donna Bellissima.

Books
Filicia is the author of Thom Filicia Style published in 2008 by Atria/Simon & Schuster, and is a contributing author of Queer Eye For The Straight Guy: The Fab 5 Guide To Living Better. His American Beauty: Renovating and Decorating a Beloved Retreat was published in 2012 by Clarkson Potter Publishers.

Awards
Queer Eye won an Emmy in 2004 for Outstanding Reality Program, and received a nomination again in the same category in 2005.
In 2011 he was named as one of Elle Decors top 25 A-List Designers, in 2006 he was chosen as one of House Beautifuls Top 100 American Designers and House & Gardens Top 50 "Tastemakers".

References

External links
Official website

Food Bank For New York City public service announcement

Living people
Nottingham High School (Syracuse, New York) alumni
American interior designers
American television personalities
Emmy Award winners
American LGBT broadcasters
LGBT people from New York (state)
Syracuse University College of Visual and Performing Arts alumni
Artists from Syracuse, New York
Television personalities from Syracuse, New York
American chief executives
Year of birth missing (living people)